Second Cabinet of Waldemar Pawlak was the government of Poland from 18 October 1993 – 6 March 1995 during the 2nd legislature of the Sejm and the 3rd legislature of the Senate. It was appointed by President Lech Wałęsa on 18 October 1993, and passed the vote of confidence in Sejm on 10 November 1993. Led by Waldemar Pawlak, it is a centre-left coalition of two major parties: social democratic Democratic Left Alliance (SLD) and the agrarian Polish People's Party (PSL). Waldemar Pawlak succeeded Hanna Suchocka, who was the first female Polish Prime Minister.

Pawlak, Waldemar
1993 establishments in Poland
Cabinets established in 1993